Leslie is a rural locality in the Southern Downs Region, Queensland, Australia.

Geography 
The Condamine River forms the northern boundary of the locality and the Cunningham Highway forms most of the southern boundary. The South Western railway line passes through the locality from the south to the west.

History 
The locality was named and bounded on 14 September 2001. The name comes from the former Leslie railway station  which was named after Patrick Leslie, a pioneer pastoralist on the Darling Downs.

References 

Southern Downs Region
Localities in Queensland